Jason Joseph "J. J." Furmaniak (born July 31, 1979) is a former American professional baseball infielder, who played in the major leagues for the Pittsburgh Pirates and the Oakland Athletics.

Early life and career
Furmaniak was born in Bolingbrook, Illinois After graduating from Bolingbrook High School, Furmaniak attended college at Lewis University in Romeoville, Illinois.

He was drafted by the San Diego Padres in the 22nd round of the 2000 Major League Baseball draft.
 He was a Minor League All-Star in 2000, 2003 and 2005.
 Furmaniak made his major league debut with the Pittsburgh Pirates on September 13, 2005, and played with the Pirates for the 2005 season. He played for the Oakland Athletics during the 2007 Season. Furmaniak became a free agent on October 7, after refusing an outright assignment to the minors.

He signed with the Yokohama BayStars of Nippon Professional Baseball during the offseason, and played with the team for the 2008 season. On December 17, Furmaniak signed a minor league contract with the Philadelphia Phillies. He appeared in 118 games with the Phillies' AAA affiliate in 2009, hitting .230 with five home runs while driving in 48 runs. He later signed with the Tampa Bay Rays on February 4, 2010, as a free agent. Furmaniak played in the minors in 2010 and 2011.

Personal life
He is married to Jen Furmaniak and they have one son and one daughter together.

References

Further reading
 "Major League Dads: Baseball's Best Players Reflect on the Fathers Who Inspired Them to Love the Game" by Kevin Neary and Leigh A. Tobin, published by Running Press, 2012.

External links
 
 J.J. Furmaniak hopes for a little more baseball heaven

1979 births
Living people
American expatriate baseball players in Japan
Baseball players from Illinois
Fort Wayne Wizards players
Idaho Falls Padres players
Indianapolis Indians players
Lake Elsinore Storm players
Lewis Flyers baseball players
Major League Baseball second basemen
Mobile BayBears players
Nippon Professional Baseball first basemen
Nippon Professional Baseball second basemen
Nippon Professional Baseball shortstops
Oakland Athletics players
People from Bolingbrook, Illinois
Pittsburgh Pirates players
Portland Beavers players
Sacramento River Cats players
Sportspeople from Naperville, Illinois
Yokohama BayStars players